Armentarius of Pavia was Bishop of Pavia from 711 to 732; it was during his episcopacy that the see became attached to the Roman Church directly.

References

732 deaths
Italian Roman Catholic saints
8th-century Italian bishops
Bishops of Pavia
Year of birth unknown